First Sunday is a 2008 American crime comedy film written, produced and directed by David E. Talbert, and produced by Ice Cube, who also starred in the lead role. The film co-stars Katt Williams and Tracy Morgan. The film was released in the United States on January 11, 2008. Ice Cube, Katt Williams, Rickey Smiley and Clifton Powell had all starred in the film Friday After Next six years prior.

Released theatrically by Sony Pictures on January 11, 2008, First Sunday received generally negative reviews, but grossed $38.8 million worldwide.

Plot

Best friends Durell (Ice Cube) and LeeJohn (Tracy Morgan) are bumbling petty criminals in Baltimore. They struggle to find stable jobs due to their records.  Durell's ex, Omunique (Regina Hall) is also threatening to move to Atlanta with their son, Durell Jr. unless she gets help to pay her lease on her salón. Desperate for money, Durell and LeeJohn agree to sell wheelchairs provided by con man Blahka (Paul Campbell), but they lose them in a police chase.

Sentenced to 5,000 hours of community service and Blahka threatens to kill both of them unless they pay him $12,000 within 24 hours. They try to get a loan from a guy named Mordecai who runs a massage shop. They go there to ask about a loan but change their minds. While attending a church service, LeeJohn comes up with a desperate scheme to rob it. Durell is against it but finally agrees, seeing no other option.

They enter the church's office and hold the church members hostage. The Deacon wants to move the church which angers some of the members including the Pastor's daughter Tianna (Malinda Williams). Durell explains why he is there but, as no one takes hims seriously, he fires a gun into the air to get their attention. However, the money has already been stolen. Enraged, they hold them hostage until the money turns up. Durrel interrogates everyone about the money's whereabouts. He appears to suspect Tianna, who looks down on him. Meanwhile, LeeJohn takes Timmy, a little boy, to the bathroom. When he says that he will return the child back to his mother, the kind sister Doris (Loretta Devine), the boy reveals that his real mother left him.

The police pass by, Durell orders everyone to the back room and orders Ricky (Katt Williams) to talk to the police and they simply think he is eccentric. The church is hot and Durell goes to fix the broken air conditioner, while LeeJohn watches over the hostages. To LeeJohn's bewilderment, sister Doris begins cooking for everyone, using the church kitchen. She gives him a plate, and fondly remembers how her husband loved her cooking on his birthday. He expresses his sadness at never having had a birthday, and is comforted by her.

After an awkward conversation, where Tianna warms to Durell and questions what he is doing, they finally get the air-conditioning going. Durell then orders everyone back to the lobby. The blind, deaf janitor finds the missing money. Durell receives a phone call from his son, which he is ashamed to answer. Momma T (Olivia Cole) then asks for Durell's purpose for what he is doing. Durell claims that he is doing it for his son. Momma T rejects this, saying Durell is doing it for himself, and is blaming everyone but the person responsible, himself.

He drops the money. Unfortunately, cops have surrounded the church. The pastor (Chi McBride) tells them to escape out the back, but they are caught in a chase. At their trial, which the entire church attends, the Deacon (Michael Beach) says they have been accused of stealing $64,000. But the amount of money he claims was almost stolen was twice the amount the Deacon said was collected. putting the Deacon at question. The case is dismissed after no one stands when witnesses are called. Durell goes back to Omunique's apartment, where he faces the men who gave them the wheelchairs.

After explaining his situation, they allow him to go and get his son. Omunique opens the door, yelling at Durell, asking him where the money came from. The money was left at her doorstep and Durell tells her it was a gift. He implores her not to take his son away, declaring that his son is all he has. She responds they will stay. In the end, LeeJohn and Durell are much happier. Durell is closer to his ex-wife and son, while LeeJohn remains close to Doris and Timothy. The remaining money is used to restore the community and Tianna is seen painting a community center. The movie then comes to an end explaining how the rest of the money was used for the church and the rest of the community.

Cast

Reception
On review aggregator Rotten Tomatoes, the film holds an approval rating of 12% based on 76 reviews, with an average rating of 3.80/10. The website's critics consensus reads, "First Sunday may have its heart in the right place, but its funny bone is dislocated." Metacritic reported the film had an average score of 41 out of 100, based on 21 reviews. Audiences polled by CinemaScore on the opening weekend, gave the film an average grade of "A-" on an A+ to F scale.

Box Office
The film opened at #2 at the box office, behind The Bucket List, with $17,714,821 with an average of $8,004 from 2,213 theaters. When First Sunday closed on February 24, 2008, the film has grossed $37,931,869 from the North American box office and $844,216 in the international box office adding to $38,776,085 worldwide. It grossed more than $100,000 in only four regions outside of the United States, including South Africa ($189,960), the United Kingdom and Ireland ($152,372), Kuwait ($129,332) and the United Arab Emirates ($101,412).

Releases
It was released January 11, 2008 in the United States and Canada and was released throughout Europe in April 2008. The film was released on DVD May 6, 2008. It was also released on Blu-ray, UMD and had an "Exclusive Edition" with a CD at Walmart.

References

External links
 
 
 

2008 films
2000s buddy comedy films
2000s crime comedy films
2000s heist films
African-American comedy films
African-American films
American buddy comedy films
American crime comedy films
American heist films
Cube Vision films
2000s English-language films
Films scored by Stanley Clarke
Films directed by David E. Talbert
Films produced by Ice Cube
Films set in Baltimore
Films shot in Baltimore
Screen Gems films
2008 directorial debut films
2008 comedy films
Films about dysfunctional families
Films about robbery
2000s American films